The New Market Historic District is a national historic district in New Market, Frederick County, Maryland. The district encompasses the town located along what was originally the National Pike (now MD 144). About 90 percent of the buildings in the historic district date from the 19th century and include Federal-style buildings and Greek Revival buildings, with a number of Victorian buildings, a larger example being the Ramsburg House.

It was added to the National Register of Historic Places in 1975.

References

External links
, including 2006 photo, at Maryland Historical Trust
Boundary Map of the New Market Historic District, Frederick County, at Maryland Historical Trust

Historic districts in Frederick County, Maryland
Historic districts on the National Register of Historic Places in Maryland
National Register of Historic Places in Frederick County, Maryland